American Hardcore is the fifth album by the American rock band L.A. Guns. It is their only album to feature singer Chris Van Dahl and the first to feature bass guitarist Johnny Crypt. This album continues the increase in heaviness by the band started on their previous album Vicious Circle. The band was very influenced by Pantera during this time.

The band re-branded themselves "The L.A. Guns", at the time of the release of American Hardcore, adding 'the' before its name. According to Steve Riley, this was done to note the change in direction from the band's classic line-up fronted by Phil Lewis. Also according to Riley, during the recording of American Hardcore the band was still a five-piece, as bassist Kelly Nickels was very much part of the band and received co-writing credit on eight of the 12 tracks. He quit the band once they were dropped from PolyGram. Following Nickels' departure, second guitarist Johnny Crypt switched over to bass and the band remained a four-piece.

The opening track "F.N.A." was intended to sound like a disc skipping, and is rumored to be a portion of their cover song "Black Sabbath" - available on the Japanese import version of the album - simply played backwards. A hidden track can be found following an extended break at the 17 minute mark of the final track "I am Alive". The track features an exchange between a couple of prison guards discussing the pending execution of an inmate. According to Van Dahl, he did all the voices in one straight take.

Atomic Punks singer Ralph Saenz was recruited to replace Van Dahl after he was fired in 1997 to finish out the last couple months of the tour. The band, with Saenz, would still perform several of the songs from American Hardcore, including "Give". Saenz would subsequently stay with the band to record the Wasted EP in 1998.

Track listing

Personnel
L.A. Guns
Chris Van Dahl - lead vocals
Tracii Guns - guitar, keyboards, backing vocals, mixing
Johnny Crypt - bass guitar, backing vocals
Steve Riley - drums, percussion, backing vocals

Additional musicians
Tom Eyre - keyboards on track 12, strings arrangements
Mark Noreyko, Scarlet Rivera - strings
Scott King - mandolin and harmony vocals on track 9
Franklin Rosell, Paul Alvarez, Riley Baxter, Denis Degher - additional gang vocals

Production
Denis Degher - producer, engineer, mixing
Brent Reilly - additional engineering
Alan Yoshida - mastering at A&M Studios, Hollywood

References

1996 albums
L.A. Guns albums
CMC International albums